William D. Irvine (1944 – 14 May 2021) was a Canadian historian who was Professor Emeritus of History at York University. 

Irvine was born in 1944 in British Columbia, Canada. He received his B.A. degree in 1965 from the University of British Columbia and Ph.D. from Princeton University in 1971. Irvine began his teaching career at York University in 1971 at the Glendon campus before moving to the Keele campus where he taught until his retirement in 2011. He was a specialist in French history, particularly French conservatism and the right.

As an author, he has largely been collected by libraries.

Irvine died on May 14, 2021 after a battle with cancer.

Books
French Conservatism in Crisis: The Republican Federation of France in the 1930s; Louisiana State University Press (1979). 
The Boulanger Affair Reconsidered: Royalism, Boulangism, and the Origins of the Radical Right in France; Oxford University Press (1989). 
Between Justice and Politics: The Ligue des Droits de l’Homme, 1898-1945; Stanford University Press (2006).

References

External links
York University profile

Living people
1944 births
20th-century Canadian historians
Canadian male non-fiction writers
Canadian people of Irish descent
Academic staff of York University
University of British Columbia alumni
Princeton University alumni
21st-century Canadian historians